Antoine Pol (23 August 1888 in Douai – 21 June 1971 in Seine-Port) was a French poet.

Biography 
As an artillery captain, he fought in the First World War, and later worked at the Houve mines in Strasbourg in 1919.

In 1945, he became president of the Central Syndicate of Carbon Importers of France. When he retired in 1959, he was finally able to pursue his passions: poetry, books and butterflies.

Pol is primarily known as the author of the poem Les Passantes, set to music and interpreted by Georges Brassens in 1972 in his album Fernande. Fabrizio De André translated the song into Italian in his album Canzoni, which came out in 1974. Brassens' adaptation omitted two stanzas; Richard Parreau sang and recorded the entire poem in 1998.

When Georges Brassens discovered this poem, he asked Antoine Pol for permission to set it to music, which the latter granted. Brassens, wanting to meet him, arranged for a meeting to take place after a month, but Pol died away a week before he could meet him. One of Brassens' greatest regrets was never to have met him.

Bibliography 

 1918: Émotions poétiques 
 1924: Le Livre de maman
 1941: Destins, poèmes de ce temps et de toujours
 1947: Plaisirs d'amour
 1970: Croquis
 1971: Coktails
 Les Passantes (poem)

1888 births
1971 deaths
French male poets
20th-century French poets
20th-century French male writers